Erythriastis is a genus of moths in the family Gelechiidae.

Species
 Erythriastis rhodocrossa (Meyrick, 1914)
 Erythriastis rubentula (Meyrick, 1914)

References

Gelechiinae
Taxa named by Edward Meyrick
Moth genera